A maths school is a type of specialist free school sixth form college in England which specialises in the study of mathematics. Each maths school is sponsored by a university and, frequently, also a nearby established sixth form college or multi-academy trust. All students in a maths school must follow a course of study that includes A-levels in mathematics and further mathematics. Maths schools receive additional funding from central government, above what a standard sixth form college would receive, with the aim of providing an enriched curriculum and student experience, so that students are better prepared for studies in mathematics or related subjects at competitive universities, or for careers requiring high levels of mathematical skill. Maths schools are selective and all students seeking to apply must have, at minimum, a grade 8 in GCSE mathematics. Students must also sit an entry exam before being admitted.

Features of maths schools 
Maths schools are a type of free school, however they are unique in multiple ways. Free schools are legally barred from partaking in academic selection, however all maths schools are selective and therefore exempt from this rule. They are not required to follow both the School Admissions Code and the School Admission Appeal Code. Maths schools are, in most cases, housed in old repurposed buildings that have undergone refurbishment and remodelling. Every maths school is run by an academy trust, sponsored by a university and, sometimes additionally, an existing local sixth form college or multi-academy trust. Each year, they receive an additional £350,000 of funding from central government. The curricula of specialist maths schools are provided through partnerships with sponsor universities. All students at maths schools must study A-levels in mathematics and further mathematics and they usually study physics and/or computer science in addition. They are exclusively for students aged 16 to 19, whereas normal free schools and other academies can serve students from primary education onwards.

Maths schools are required, as part of their core business, to deliver significant outreach work – programmes that help establish maths schools as centres of excellence. Outreach plans are developed in collaboration with local schools and colleges and are integral to the widening commitments of a maths school's sponsor university. They prioritise disadvantaged students, primarily girls, and raise awareness of the mathematics curriculum that will be offered by the school to potential students, preparing them for the study of advanced mathematics. Outreach programmes are complemented by maths hubs, regional leadership networks for mathematical improvement.

History 
Maths schools were conceptualised by Dominic Cummings during his time as adviser to Education Secretary Michael Gove in 2010. They were largely inspired by the Russian institutions of the same name, established by renowned mathematician Andrey Kolmogorov. They were announced by the Cameron–Clegg coalition a year later, with the aim of 12 being established over a three-year period. However, many universities were reluctant to sponsor them, citing the low number of students entering continued mathematical education after the age of 16. The first two maths schools, the King's College London Mathematics School and Exeter Mathematics School, opened in 2014.

In January 2017, Prime Minister Theresa May announced her intention for every British city to have a maths school as part of an attempt to encourage technical education after Brexit. A budget of £170 million was allocated for this purpose. In November 2017, Chancellor of the Exchequer Philip Hammond granted an annual fund of £350,000 to every maths school. In March 2017 the Minister for Schools, Nick Gibb, promoted maths schools, asking multiple universities to establish them. Many of these universities refused the offer.

In September 2019, Education Secretary Gavin Williamson announced the establishment of nine more specialist maths schools. At the 2019 Conservative Party Conference it was announced that there would be a maths school in every region of England. These plans were reinforced in March 2020 when Chancellor Rishi Sunak released that year's budget. The budget dedicated £7 million to the establishment of these maths schools. In September 2020 the third maths school, University of Liverpool Maths School, opened. More maths schools are opening from 2022.

List of current and approved future maths schools

See also 
 University technical college
 Studio school
 Academy (English school)
 Free school (England)

References 

Education in England
School types
State schools in the United Kingdom
Specialist schools